The Avengers are a series of fictional superhero teams that have starred in The Avengers and related comic book series published by Marvel Comics. 

Characters listed in bold are the members of the main team .

Original Team (1963–2004)

The First Avengers 
All of these members helped form the team in The Avengers #1 (September 11, 1963).

"Cap's Kooky Quartet"

The Mighty Demi-God Squad

Note 1: In Avengers #9 (October 1964), Wonder Man joins the Avengers as a villainous ruse, in order to betray them to Baron Zemo and the Masters of Evil; however, he ultimately sacrifices himself to save the heroes. He returns from the dead a decade later  and rejoins the team (see below).

Note 2: In Avengers #19-20 (August-September 1965), the Swordsman joins the Avengers as a villainous ruse (he is working for the Mandarin), but has a change of heart and flees. He rejoins the team a decade later (see below).

Spy Avengers

The Old Royal Avengers

West Coast Avengers recruits (1984–1987)

Avengers members recruited by Hawkeye as the West Coast Avengers chair.

Post-Inferno recruits (1989–1990)

UN Charter recruits (1991–1992)

Post-Heroes Return recruits (1998–2004)

New Avengers recruits (2005)

The New Avengers were formed due to a mass break-out at the super villain prison The Raft.

Post-Civil War recruits (2007–2009)

The New Avengers became a splinter group that chose not to comply with federal superhuman registration, as opposed to the governmental-sanctioned team presented in Mighty Avengers then Dark Avengers. The Mighty Avengers after the Dark Avengers launch was an international agency sanctioned team.

Heroic Age recruits (2010–2011)

Characters who have officially joined the Avengers after the events of Dark Reign and Siege.

Shattered Heroes recruits (2011–2012)
After the Fear Itself event, the lineup of the Avengers teams was shifted by Captain America during the Shattered Heroes storyline.

Marvel NOW! recruits (2012–2013)
After the Avengers vs. X-Men event, members from both Avengers and X-Men teams were shifted by Captain America during the Marvel NOW! storyline.

Infinity recruits (2013–2014)
Characters that joined the team during the Infinity event.

Avengers NOW! recruits (2014–2015)

All-New All-Different! recruits (2015–2016)

Post-Civil War II recruits (2016–present)

Honorary
Heroes that have been granted honorary status during their lifetime or posthumously for acts of great courage and/or sacrifice.

Guardians of the Galaxy (1978)

A group of superheroes from the 31st century, the Guardians of the Galaxy time traveled to the 20th century in vol. 1 #168 (February 1978) and served as honorary members during the Korvac saga.

Young Avengers

A group of teenage heroes modeled after the Avengers, the surviving Young Avengers were awarded honorary membership following the "Children's Crusade" storyline.

Avengers Third Grade

The Avengers promoted several senior Academy students to "Avengers Third Grade", as part of a plan to eventually award them full Avengers membership.

Infiltrators

Not officially sanctioned Avengers teams

According to "Empyre Handbook (2020) #1", the following groups, while either affiliated with the Avengers or even using the Avengers name, are not officially sanctioned Avenger franchises and their members do not hold Avengers membership: "Avengers Idea Mechanics", Ultimates (Captain Marvel/Carol Danvers-led), "A-Force", "Occupy Avengers", "U.S.Avengers", West Coast Avengers (Hawkeye/Kate Bishop-led), Savage Avengers".

Avengers Idea Mechanics (2015)
A team created during the Time Runs Out storyline which takes place eight months in the future. Sunspot reveals that he bought A.I.M and used their resources to investigate the incursions. 

After the All-New All-Different rebrand, Sunspot took control of A.I.M., and changed the name to Avengers Idea Mechanics.

Ultimates (2015)
An ultimate super team, solving the ultimate problems.

A-Force (2016)
First appearing as part of an alternate universe during "Secret Wars", featuring Marvel's first all-female team of Avengers, but later reemerged in Marvel's primary continuity.

Occupy Avengers (2016)
After Civil War II, Clint Barton (Hawkeye) starts traveling the country and focuses his efforts towards helping the underprivileged with community based problems in an effort to redeem his actions from the event, beginning with the water supply in Santa Rosa. He eventually gains the aid of Red Wolf to help him fight for those who cannot defend themselves

U.S.Avengers (2017)
When Advanced Idea Mechanics merged with the U.S. military to form American Intelligence Mechanics, Sunspot, under the alias of Citizen V, formed the U.S.Avengers, a traditionally patriotic-themed team of unsanctioned Avengers.

New West Coast Avengers (2018)
A team founded by Clint Barton and his successor Kate Bishop that decided to revive the West Coast Avengers following an attack by land sharks in Santa Monica.

Notes

References 

 
Avengers members, List of
Lists of Marvel Comics characters by organization
Lists of Avengers (comics) characters